Louis Delaunoij (3 March 1879 – 29 October 1947) was a Dutch fencer. He won a bronze medal in the team sabre event at the 1920 Summer Olympics.

References

External links
 

1879 births
1947 deaths
Dutch male fencers
Olympic fencers of the Netherlands
Fencers at the 1920 Summer Olympics
Olympic bronze medalists for the Netherlands
Olympic medalists in fencing
Fencers from Amsterdam
Medalists at the 1920 Summer Olympics
19th-century Dutch people
20th-century Dutch people